Port Qasim Authority cricket team was a first-class cricket team which plays in the domestic circuit of Pakistan. The team is sponsored by the Port Qasim Authority in Karachi. The team qualified for first-class cricket in May 2012, following success in the PCB Patron's Trophy (Grade II) tournament. Among the team's notable players is Mohammad Sami. The team is coached by former Pakistani cricketer, Rashid Latif.

In 2012–13, Port Qasim Authority finished ninth out of 10 teams in the President's Trophy. In 2013-14 they finished sixth out of 11 teams. The captain in both seasons was Khalid Latif.

The highest score so far is by Umar Amin, who scored 281 against Habib Bank Limited in 2012–13. The best bowling figures are 7 for 29 by G.A.Mustafa against National Bank of Pakistan in 2015–16. He took 12 for 83 in the match, which National Bank of Pakistan nevertheless won by two wickets.

Notable players
 Shahzaib Ahmed
 Tanvir Ahmed
 Atif Ali
 Faraz Ali
 Umar Amin
 Shahzaib Hasan
 Azam Hussain
 Shadab Kabir
 Aariz Kamal
 Asim Kamal
 Khalid Latif
 Khurram Manzoor
 Abdur Rauf
 Mohammad Salman
 Mohammad Sami
 Zohaib Shera
 Mohammad Talha
 Usman Tariq
 Noor Wali
 Taj Wali

References

External links
 First-class matches played by Port Qasim Authority

Pakistani first-class cricket teams